Dennis B. Danielson (January 29, 1921 - February 19, 1972) was a member of the Wisconsin State Assembly.

Biography
Danielson was born on January 29, 1921, in Dunn County, Wisconsin. During World War II, he served in the United States Navy, reaching the rank of lieutenant commander. Danielson graduated from the University of Wisconsin-Eau Claire and the University of Wisconsin School of Law.  He died on February 19, 1972.

Political career
Danielson was a member of the assembly from 1957 to 1958. In 1962, he ran for the United States House of Representatives from Wisconsin's 9th congressional district, losing to Lester Johnson. He was a Republican.

References

People from Dunn County, Wisconsin
Republican Party members of the Wisconsin State Assembly
Military personnel from Wisconsin
United States Navy officers
United States Navy personnel of World War II
1921 births
1972 deaths
University of Wisconsin–Eau Claire alumni
University of Wisconsin Law School alumni
20th-century American politicians